The Damnation Game may refer to:

 The Damnation Game (novel) (1985), by horror writer Clive Barker
 The Damnation Game (album), a 1995 album by progressive metal band Symphony X